The Opal Storage Specification is a set of specifications for features of data storage devices (such as hard disk drives and solid state drives) that enhance their security.  For example, it defines a way of encrypting the stored data so that an unauthorized person who gains possession of the device cannot see the data.  That is, it is a specification for self-encrypting drives (SED).

The specification is published by the Trusted Computing Group Storage Workgroup.

SSC Overview

The Opal SSC (Security Subsystem Class) is an implementation profile for Storage Devices built to:
 Protect the confidentiality of stored user data against unauthorized access once it leaves the owner's control (involving a power cycle and subsequent deauthentication).
 Enable interoperability between multiple SD vendors.

Functions 

The Opal SSC encompasses these functions:
 Security provider support
 Interface communication protocol
 Cryptographic features
 Authentication
 Table management
 Access control and personalization
 Issuance
 SSC discovery

Features 

 Security Protocol 1 support
 Security Protocol 2 support
 Communications
 Protocol stack reset commands

Security 

Radboud University researchers indicated in November 2018 that some hardware encryption, including some Opal implementations, had security vulnerabilities.

Implementers of SSC

Device Companies 
 Hitachi
 Intel Corporation
 Kingston Technology
 Lenovo
 Micron Technology
 Samsung
 SanDisk
 Seagate Technology
 Toshiba

Storage Controller Companies 
 Marvell
 Avago/LSI SandForce flash controllers

Software companies
 Absolute Software
 Check Point Software Technologies
 Dell Data Protection
 Cryptomill
 McAfee
 Secude 
 Softex Incorporated
 Sophos
 Symantec (Symantec supports OPAL drives, but does not support hardware-based encryption.)
 Trend Micro
 WinMagic
 OpalLock(OpalLock support Self-Encrypt-Drive capable SSD and HDD. Develop by Fidelity Height LLC)

Computer OEMs
 Dell
 HP
 Lenovo
 Fujitsu
 Panasonic
 Getac

References

External links
Storage Work Group Storage Security Subsystem Class: Opal

Computer security
Computer storage technologies